Following the division of Korea in the aftermath of the Korean War, the percent of foreigners in South Korea has risen to 3.4%, or about two million of the total population (half of them Chinese, with Americans and Vietnamese tied for second place over 150,000, or 6-7% of the total number of foreigners). North Korea largely remains ethnically homogeneous with a small Chinese expatriate community and a few Japanese people.

History

In 1882, King Gojong called foreigners "uneducated louts", motivated by "lechery and sensuality". The Joseon Dynasty was widely referred to as a "hermit kingdom" for sealing itself off from foreign influence. Joseon diplomacy mainly involved the Sadae ("serving the great") policy toward Imperial China. Concurrently maintained (and jointly referred to as "serving the great and relations with neighbor policy" ) was the Gyorin policy of amicable relations with neighbouring countries; however this did not result in significant influx of foreign persons but rather sporadic trade delegations and diplomatic missions: envoys from the Ryūkyū Kingdom were received by Taejo of Joseon in 1392, 1394 and 1397. Siam sent an envoy to Taejo's court in 1393.

The Joseon kingdom made every effort to maintain a friendly bilateral relationship with China for reasons having to do with both realpolitik and a more idealist Confucian worldview wherein China was seen as the center of a Confucian moral universe.
In the fifth through tenth centuries, Arabs sailed the Indian Ocean, and Arab merchants and sailors eventually landed in Korea during the Silla dynasty. These contacts eventually broke off starting in the fifteenth century, resulting in the Arabs' eventual assimilation into the Korean population.

North Korea

The foreign relations of North Korea are often tense and unpredictable. The number of foreign residents is correspondingly very small, and is essentially limited to Japanese spouses of "repatriating" Zainichi Koreans, expatriates from the People's Republic of China, foreign diplomats, and a few defectors such as James Joseph Dresnok and Joseph T. White.

South Korea

South Korea is among the world's most ethnically homogeneous nations, i.e. those with majority of the population of one ethnicity. Since the end of the Korean War in 1953, South Korea has been far more open to foreign influence, especially American.

There were 1,741,919 total foreign residents in Korea in 2015, compared to 1,576,034 in 2013. As of September 2015, according to the Ministry of Government Administration and Home Affairs, the foreign population in South Korea, including migrant workers, increased to 1.8 million, accounting for 3.4% of the total population.

The biggest group of foreigners in Korea are the Chinese. In 1970, an estimated 120,000 Chinese resided in South Korea. However, due to economic restrictions by the South Korean government, the number may have fallen to as low as 21,000. In the 10-year period starting in the late 1990s, the number of Chinese in Korea exploded. In the mid 2000s it was estimated that there are at least 300,000 and possibly more than 1,000,000 In 2009 it was estimated there are about 450,000 Chinese Koreans. 
Chinese citizens living in South Korea as permanent residents or illegal immigrants, including Joseonjok (Chinese citizens of Korean descent) and Han Chinese. There is a large Chinese community in Seoul's southwestern area (Daerim/Namguro) and a smaller but established a community in Seongnam. Ethnic Chinese in Korea are known as Hwagyo by the Koreans.

As of 2016, there were 710,000 Chinese nationals living in Korea, of which ethnic Koreans from China accounted for 500,000, Chinese 190,000 and Taiwanese 20,000. Together, they accounted for 51.6 percent of all foreigners in Korea.

The second-biggest group of foreigners in South Korea are migrant workers from Southeast Asia and increasingly from Central Asia (notably Uzbekistan, mostly ethnic Koreans from there, and Mongolians), and in the main cities, particularly Seoul, there is a small but growing number of foreigners related to business and education.

The number of marriages between Koreans and foreigners has risen steadily in the past few years. In 2005, 14% of all marriages in South Korea were marriages to foreigners (about 26,000 marriages); most were rural Korean men marrying other Asian women from poor backgrounds. Korean men in age brackets up to their 40s outnumber slightly younger Korean women, both due to a high sex ratio and the drop in the birth rate since the 1960s, leading to a huge demand for wives. Many Korean agencies encourage 'international' marriages to Chinese, Vietnamese, Filipina, Indonesian, and Thai women, adding a new degree of complexity to the issue of ethnicity.

The number of expatriate English teachers hailing from English-speaking nations has increased from less than 1,000 in 1988 to over 20,000 in 2002, and stood at more than 22,000 in 2010. There are 28,500 United States military personnel and civilian employees throughout the country, an increasing number of whom are also accompanied by family members.

Influence in entertainment and the arts 
Korean media is widely influenced by expatriate entertainers. Performers, often residing with controversial E6 visas provide several assets: a desirable native English language factor - though many are famously bilingual, and contribution to Korea's desire for cultural diversity, image, and English proficiency. English media is available through major broadcasting entities. Though highly unregulated, the expat presence in Korea is encouraged by the prevalence of the Korean wave.

Korea is home to the headquarters of several major players in gaming and dub-overs. Due to the globalization of popular media, expats are the driving force behind many productions and the competition is described as being harsh due to the popularity of K-dramas. TV personalities such as Americans Carson Allen, Daniel Joey Albright, Khalid Tapia; South African Bronwyn Mullen and Australian actor Sam Hammington are well known to viewers, often appearing in popular variety shows.

Some performers have reached household name status. Veteran Isaac Durst, an American actor, is well known for his extensive work catering to kids, family friendly TV and radio. Broadcasters such as kyopo Lisa Kelley, Ghana-born Sam Okyere, Canadian sports commentator Jason Lee, and popular advertisement voice actor Richard Kim who hails from America have been formally recognized for their influence on the Korean media industry. So frequent are their contributions that their voices are considered staples in Korean media, particularly in TV and radio.

On the practical side of entertainment in Asia, a booming voice industry is lucrative. Recognized voiceover actors such as American born Jennifer Clyde, who has been dubbed "the voice of Korea in 'English' reach millions through commercials, games and dubbing. Multi-genre performers such as Canadian Jesse Day, Kelly Frances, Stephen Revere, Belgian DJ-actor Julian Quintart, and French performer-model-MC Fabien Yoon contribute through content, voice and live performances. Singer-actress Samia Mounts is credited for her role in Pokémon and American-Korean voice acting, having spent her youth in Korea. In the classical music genre, Dr. Ryan Goessl has built the Camarata Music Company, one of the world's most diverse music organizations, in Seoul. The organization, which boasts members from 101 different countries, can be seen in concert up to 40 times per year. Dr. Goessl can also be seen performing on Korea's national stages as both a choral/orchestral conductor, as well as a classical vocal soloist, in addition to coaching Korea's classical, rock, and KPOP singers, along with voice actors.

The foodie scene has its own prolific expat: Joe McPherson, author, resteraunteer and tour guide, whose work reached the New York times and landed him a consultant role during Anthony Bourdain's visit to Seoul. Additionally, Daniel Gray is an adoptee from the United States who made a brand for himself as a local foodie and author.

Joe McPherson also operates the Dark Side of Seoul dark tour with Shawn Morrissey. Both also co-host the Dark Side of Seoul podcast. Morrissey is a heritage researcher and folklorist who wrote a comic book based on the Dark Side of Seoul tour.

Radio in English is considered essential for ESL learners, and one of Korea's best known hosts, veteran Stephen Hatherly, runs a long-standing show - named after himself at English station TBSeFM. American Dorothy Nam is a celebrated host and well known Korean-American personality.

The DJ scene is gaining global respect, and with it, expat professionals. Bellydancing is popular and led by expats such as Australian veteran Belynda Azhaar, PhD., often tying performance to social causes. British DJ Oli Fenn (DJ Fenner) is recognized as a local and multinational professional DJ.

As Seoul continues to develop its fashion presence, Expat models are common. Among them, Brazilian veteran Jane Aquino is known as a successful foreign model, posing alongside K-pop idols and working for the likes of high-profile fashion houses such as Hermes. Veteran (former military) designer and model Julian Woodhouse is famous for dominating the fashion scene in Seoul and making his way to prominence in the American fashion industry.

YouTube has gained popularity, with American veteran David Levene being the most recognizable for his success with half a million subscribers.

Statistics
Number of foreign residents in South Korea up to 2019.

Nationalities of legal foreign residents in South Korea as of 2019.

See also
 Demographics of South Korea
 Immigration to South Korea
 North Korean defectors
 South Korean defectors
 Multicultural family in South Korea

References

External links
 Korean Statistical Information System
 South Korea: Balancing Labor Demand with Strict Controls, Park Young-bum, Migration Information Source, December 2004.